The HaMoshava Stadium, also known as Petah Tikva Stadium, is a football stadium in Petah Tikva, Israel. It was completed in 2011, and is used mainly for football matches and is home to both Hapoel Petah Tikva and Maccabi Petah Tikva, and it has been used as the temporary homeground of Sektzia Ness Ziona.

The stadium has an all-seated capacity of 11,500 with an option for further construction of 8,500 on the south and north stands, totaling 20,000 seats.

As part of a larger sports park in the new industrial area of the city, the complex will also boast a 3,000 seat multi-purpose arena, and artificial turf training fields. The budget for the stadium was US$25 million.

The designers of the new stadium were GAB (Goldshmidt Arditty Ben Nayim) Architects, one of Israel's leading sport architecture firms that also designed the new Netanya Stadium and Haberfeld Stadium.

The stadium was inaugurated on 6 December 2011, after almost two years of construction. It was one of four venues for the 2013 UEFA European Under-21 Football Championship, staging three group matches and a semi-final.

The stadium's naming was controversial in Petah Tikva, as some local residents wished to name it Rosh HaZahav (Gold head), after local city club Hapoel Petah Tikva and Israel national football player Nahum Stelmach.
As a result, Maccabi Petah Tikva supporters proposed to name the stadium after Shmuel Ben-Dror, who played in the club for more than twenty years, was Israel's first captain and scored the first ever goal for Israel.
After the city's refusal it was named HaMoshava after Petah Tikva's nickname, Em HaMoshavot (Mother of the Moshavot).

In 2014 HaMoshava Stadium hosted the 2014 United Supercup.

International matches

See also
Sports in Israel

References

External links

 

Football venues in Israel
Multi-purpose stadiums in Israel
Hapoel Petah Tikva F.C.
Maccabi Petah Tikva F.C.
Sports venues completed in 2011
Sports venues in Petah Tikva